Troma Entertainment is an American independent film production and distribution company founded by Lloyd Kaufman and Michael Herz in 1974. The company produces low-budget independent films, primarily of the horror comedy genre. Many of them play on 1950s horror with elements of farce, parody, gore, and splatter.

In 2012, the company officially released many of its films on YouTube. However, their YouTube channel was eventually terminated for not meeting community standards.

Troma has produced, acquired, and distributed over 1,000 independent films since its creation. Its slogan in 2014 was "40 years of Disrupting Media". Another slogan the company has used is "Movies of the Future." The company also has its own streaming service called Troma Now.

Company information

Troma films are B-movies known for their surrealistic or automatistic nature, along with their use of shocking imagery; some would categorize them as "shock exploitation films". They typically contain overt sexuality, nudity, and intentionally sadistic, gory, and blatant graphic violence, so much that Troma film has become a term synonymous with these characteristics. Troma reuses the same props, actors, and scenes repeatedly, sometimes to save money. At a certain point, however, this became another hallmark of Troma. Examples include a severed leg, a penis monster, and the flipping and exploding car filmed for the movie Sgt. Kabukiman N.Y.P.D., which is used in place of any other car that needs to crash and explode.

Troma produced or acquired early films featuring several rising talents, such as Carmen Electra (The Chosen One), Billy Bob Thornton (Chopper Chicks in Zombietown), Vanna White (Graduation Day), Kevin Costner (Sizzle Beach, U.S.A.), J. J. Abrams (Nightbeast), Samuel L. Jackson (Def by Temptation), Marisa Tomei (The Toxic Avenger), Michael Jai White (The Toxic Avenger Part II), Vincent D'Onofrio (The First Turn-On!), David Boreanaz (Macabre Pair of Shorts), Paul Sorvino (Cry Uncle!), James Gunn (Tromeo and Juliet), Trey Parker and Matt Stone (Cannibal! The Musical), before they were discovered. Another Academy Award-winning director, Oliver Stone, made his debut as an actor in The Battle of Love's Return.

The studio prides itself on its self-imposed "Rules of Production":

 Safety to humans
 Safety to property
 Make a good movie! (written in smaller font than the first two)

Their latest production, Shakespeare's Shitstorm, was released in 2020.

History
In the mid-1970s, Kaufman and Herz began producing, directing, and distributing raunchy sex comedies such as The First Turn-On! and Squeeze Play!. Troma provided production support for Louis Malle's My Dinner With Andre, for which Kaufman served as a production manager.

In 1985, Troma had a hit with the violent comedy horror superhero film The Toxic Avenger. The film went on to become Troma's most popular, spawning sequels and an animated television program. However, following the financial demise of the company Troma itself, the sequels to the film were box office bombs, and the cartoon adaptation quickly ended. The Toxic Avenger character is now Troma's official mascot.

Kaufman's follow-up film to The Toxic Avenger was Class of Nuke 'Em High, co-directed with Richard W. Haines. The film was a hit nearly as successful, though it inspired two unsuccessful sequels, both following the financial demise of Troma. At one time, it was the highest-selling VHS release for Troma.

The Toxic Avenger was turned into a musical which debuted at the George Street Playhouse in New Brunswick, New Jersey and opened in New York in the fall of 2008. The Toxic Avenger Musical book by Joe DiPietro, the author of the long-running I Love You, You're Perfect, Now Change and All Shook Up, was released the same year. The music is by David Bryan, keyboardist of the rock band Bon Jovi.

Soon after Class of Nuke 'Em High was completed and distributed, Kaufman directed Troma's War. Intended as a criticism of what it saw as Ronald Reagan's attempt to glamorize war, the story concerns a group of everyday people who crash land on a remote island, only to find it populated by an isolationist militia that intends to overthrow the US government. Troma's War was a box office bomb. In the aftermath of the film's poor performance, despite another stab at the superhero genre with Sgt. Kabukiman N.Y.P.D., Troma experienced financial hardship and tried to reestablish itself as a smaller company mostly out of necessity.

Today, the majority of Troma films are viewed for the first time on VHS or DVD, with some theatrical releases for their films in smaller art houses, college campuses, and independent cinemas.

Work since 1995
From 1995 to 2000, Troma had a period of creativity and produced some of their greatest work. Kaufman directed three independent films, all distributed in limited theatrical releases: Tromeo and Juliet, a loose parody of Shakespeare's play; Terror Firmer, a slasher film loosely based on Kaufman's book All I Need to Know about Filmmaking I Learned from The Toxic Avenger, and an independent film sequel to The Toxic Avenger trilogy titled Citizen Toxie: The Toxic Avenger IV.

Troma's financial hardship worsened after the botched funding of a low-budget video feature titled Tales from the Crapper, which cost $250,000 despite most of the footage being completely unusable. India Allen, one of the producers, backed out of the film halfway through, and sued Troma, citing breach of contract, slander, sexual harassment, trade slander, and intentional infliction of emotional distress. Kaufman supervised a reshoot in an attempt to salvage the film, dividing the footage into two parts and recasting the film as a double feature. Tales from the Crapper was released on DVD in September 2004.

Currently, Troma produces and acquires independent films, despite financial hardships and limitations. Troma Films has distributed many films from third parties including Trey Parker's Cannibal! The Musical. Lloyd encourages independent filmmaking, making cameo appearances in many low-budget horror films, occasionally without fee. Among his more recent appearances is in former collaborator James Gunn's directing debut, Slither, and Guardians of the Galaxy.

Kaufman's long-time editor Gabriel Friedman co-directed and wrote the screenplay to his follow-up film, Poultrygeist: Night of the Chicken Dead, a musical zom-com which made its official New York premiere on May 9, 2008 (although the film had previewed numerous times on single screens for over a year). The film opened to positive reviews from Entertainment Weekly and The New York Times and was released in 2006 in theaters and in 2008 on DVD.

During the winter of 2010/2011, Troma produced a feature-length film Father's Day, which Kaufman calls "a response film to Mother's Day". The film was written and directed by the Canadian filmmaking team Astron-6, debuting October 21, 2011, at the Toronto After Dark Film Festival where it took home the top prize of BEST FILM, as well as five other awards. In 2012 Father's Day was featured on the cover of Rue Morgue magazine and won Best Feature Film, Best Director, Best Male Performance, and Best Special Effects at The Fantastic Planet/A Night of Horror International film festival.  This is rare for a film that cost only ten thousand dollars to make.  On October 31, 2012, Father's Day was refused classification in Australia, which makes it effectively illegal to sell or exhibit the film. A second censored version was eventually passed with an R18+ rating.

In August 2012, Troma released over 100 of its back catalog films on YouTube, many for free, some for 48-hour paid viewing. However, their YouTube channel was terminated in 2020 for not meeting community standards. This occurred after YouTube received several complaints about the channel.

Hollywood
On April 7, 2010, Kaufman confirmed that a PG-13 remake of The Toxic Avenger was happening and will be produced by Akiva Goldsman. It actually is not the first attempt at a general audience-friendly version of the franchise, as Make Your Own Damn Movie noted a prior deal with New Line in the early 90s for a live-action take on the Toxic Crusaders. Another 1980s Troma classic, Mother's Day will also receive a remake and will be directed by Darren Lynn Bousman and produced by Brett Ratner. At the time Kaufman also said that he was negotiating a deal for a remake of  Class of Nuke 'Em High. Shortly after, Troma and Starz Entertainment entered into agreement for the production of Return to Nuke Em High as a two-volume title. The first volume was released in theaters and on home video. The second volume, delayed due to funding issues, was stated on its Kickstarter website in January 2017 to be nearing completion.

Troma Now

In 2015, Troma launched a streaming service called Troma Now, which offers many of the films distributed by Troma to subscribers. The service offers subscribers a free trial month, after which they will need to pay a monthly price of $4.99.

Other work

TromaDance 
Troma holds an annual Tromadance Festival, originally taking place in Park City, Utah at the same time as the Sundance Festival to accentuate their true independence from the mainstream. The festival screens submitted movies from independent filmmakers from around the world, the best of which are usually released on DVD by Troma or compiled in the Best of Tromadance series. In parallel, Troma acts as adviser to aspiring filmmakers with Kaufman teaching classes, contributing cameos and often releasing the finished films on DVD.

2009 marked the last time Tromadance was held in Utah; the festival was subsequently relocated to Asbury Park, New Jersey. In 2014, the festival moved to New York City, and since 2020 has been held at The Mahoning Drive-In Theater.

Kaufman's books 
Kaufman has also had some success with several non-fiction books and a novelization of The Toxic Avenger. Released in 1998, All I Need to Know about Filmmaking I Learned from The Toxic Avenger is an autobiography of sorts co-written with James Gunn. This book chronicles the history of the company, its films, and its iconic figurehead. Kaufman continued to draw on his experiences as Troma chief in the "how-to" filmmaking books Make Your Own Damn Movie!, Direct Your Own Damn Movie!, Produce Your Own Damn Movie! and Sell Your Own Damn Movie!. A DVD box set has been released to coincide with release of each of the first three books. In the video series, Kaufman interviews famous and infamous filmmakers about various filmmaking subjects.

In 2006, a novelization of The Toxic Avenger was released. It was co-written by Kaufman and long-time Troma employee Adam Jahnke.

Films distributed 

Also see List of Troma Team Video titles for a complete list of films distributed by Troma Entertainment. Below is a list of some Troma distributed films.

 B.C. Butcher
 Beware! Children at Play
 Blood Junkie
 Blood Sucking Freaks
 Cannibal! The Musical
 The Class of Nuke 'Em High series
 Class of Nuke 'Em High
 Class of Nuke 'Em High 2: Subhumanoid Meltdown
 Class of Nuke 'Em High 3: The Good, the Bad and the Subhumanoid
 Return to Nuke 'Em High Volume 1
 Return to Return to Nuke 'Em High AKA Volume 2
 The Children
 Combat Shock
 Crazy Animal
 Def by Temptation
 Dumpster Baby
 Escape from Hell
 Father's Day
 Ferocious Female Freedom Fighters
 The First Turn-On!
 Friend of the World
 Hanging Woman
 Heavy Mental: A Rock-N-Roll Bloodbath
 Hectic Knife
 Homeless Joe
 Jefftowne
 Killer Condom
 The Last Horror Film
 Lust for Freedom
 Mad Dog Morgan
 Maniac Nurses Find Ecstasy
 The Middle Finger
 Monster in the Closet
 Mother's Day
 Mr. Bricks: A Heavy Metal Murder Musical
 Nightbeast
 Pigs
 Poultrygeist: Night of the Chicken Dead
 Rabid Grannies
 Rednecks
 Redneck Zombies
 Scarlett Cross: Agents Of D.E.A.T.H.
 Screamplay
 Sgt. Kabukiman N.Y.P.D.
 Shakespeare's Shitstorm
 Sick Sock Monsters from Outer Space
 Sizzle Beach, U.S.A.
 Space Daze
 Surf Nazis Must Die
 Tale of Two Sisters
 Terror Firmer
 There's Nothing Out There
 The Toxic Avenger series
 The Toxic Avenger (1984)
 The Toxic Avenger Part II
 The Toxic Avenger Part III: The Last Temptation of Toxie
 Citizen Toxie: The Toxic Avenger IV
 The Toxic Avenger (TBA)
 Tony Trombo's Hick Trek 2
 Troma's Monster Kill
 Troma's War
 Tromeo and Juliet
 Vegas in Space
 VHS Massacre
 VHS Massacre Too
 Victor Goodview
 When Nature Calls
 Yeti: A Love Story
 Zombiegeddon

Films formerly distributed
Some titles which have at one time, or another, been distributed by Troma Inc. have left the catalog. For instance, My Neighbor Totoro was originally released by Troma's subsidiary 50th Street Films, but only for a short time, and only for U.S. theatrical release. Others were briefly licensed for distribution on VHS such as Femme Fontaine Killer Babe for the C.I.A. which was one of Troma Team Video's original launch titles along with Sgt. Kabukiman N.Y.P.D. and Class of Nuke 'em High Part III: The Good, The Bad and The Subhumanoid. Some titles, such as Maniac Nurses Find Ecstasy, are included on this list because they were previously listed but no longer appear in Troma's catalog.

 Angels' Wild Women
 The Astro-Zombies (as Astro Zombies)
 Baby Doll Murders
 Blood of Ghastly Horror
 Breakin' in the USA (breakdancing instructional video)
 Canadian Ballet
 Chopper Chicks in Zombietown
 Christmas Evil
 Club Life
 The Dark Side of Midnight
 Dracula vs. Frankenstein
 Dragon Gate
 Femme Fontaine Killer Babe For the CIA
 Fist of Fear, Touch of Death
 Ghost Ship (a children's feature film, not the horror film)
 Girls School Screamers
 Hi Mom!
 Hungry Young Woman
 I Spit on Your Corpse
 Invasion for Flesh and Blood
 Jakarta
 Mommy
 Mommy 2: Mommy's Day
 The Nick of Time
 Psycho A-Go-Go
 Pterodactyl Woman From Beverly Hills
 The Puppetoon Movie
 Recorded Live
 Rockin' Road Trip
 Romeo: Love Master of the Wild Women's Dorm
 Satan's Sadists
 Schlock (as Banana Monster)
 Space Freaks from Planet Mutoid
 Splatter University
 The Stendahl Syndrome
 Student Confidential
 That's My Baby!
 Together and Alone
 White Elephant: The Battle of the African Ghosts
 Wildrose

Sub-divisions
Troma has also created/acquired specialty distributors for its films.
50th Street Films: distributes independent films aimed at a mainstream audience; distributed My Neighbor Totoro in theaters
TromaDance: distributes films from Troma's film festival
 Roan films
Roan Archival Group Entertainment: distributes digitally remastered releases of classic films
EG Sports: distributes golf instructional films by Michael Jacobs

Tromaville
Most of the films made by Troma Entertainment take place in the fictional New Jersey city of Tromaville, known as the "Toxic Chemical Capital of the World." Examples include the Toxic Avenger films and the Class of Nuke 'Em High films. Another film worth mentioning takes place in a post-apocalyptic Tromaville titled A Nymphoid Barbarian In Dinosaur Hell. The following is a list of films that either take place in, or mention, Tromaville.
 The Toxic Avenger
 Class of Nuke 'Em High
 Troma's War
 The Toxic Avenger Part II
 The Toxic Avenger Part III: The Last Temptation of Toxie
 A Nymphoid Barbarian In Dinosaur Hell
 Sgt. Kabukiman N.Y.P.D.
 Class of Nuke 'Em High 2: Subhumanoid Meltdown
 Class of Nuke 'Em High 3: The Good, the Bad and the Subhumanoid
 Tromeo and Juliet
 Citizen Toxie: The Toxic Avenger IV
 Poultrygeist: Night of the Chicken Dead
 Father's Day
 Return to Nuke 'Em High Volume 1
 The Return of Dolphinman (short film)
 Dolphinman vs Turkeyman (short film)
 Dolphinman Battles the Sex Lobsters (short film)
 Return to Return to Nuke 'Em High AKA Volume 2
 Shakespeare's Shitstorm

References

External links
 Official website
 TromaTeam Video

1974 establishments in New York (state)
American companies established in 1974
Mass media companies established in 1974
Film distributors of the United States
Film production companies of the United States
Non-theatrical film production companies
 
Privately held companies based in New York City
American independent film studios